The 2018–19 Hong Kong Third Division League was the 5th season of Hong Kong Third Division since it became the fourth-tier football league in Hong Kong in 2014–15. The season began on 16 September 2018 and ended on 26 May 2019.

Teams

Changes from last season

From Third Division

Promoted to Second Division
 North District 
 St. Joseph's

Eliminated from league
 Tuen Mun FC
 KMB

To Third Division

Relegated from Second Division
 Kwai Tsing 
 GFC Friends 
 Sai Kung 
 Fukien

League table

References

Hong Kong Third Division League seasons
2018–19 in Hong Kong football